Give Me Some Wheels is the seventh studio album by the American country music singer-songwriter Suzy Bogguss, released on July 23, 1996 through Liberty Records. For the album's title track and lead-off single, Bogguss reunited with Matraca Berg and Gary Harrison, the co-writers of one of her most successful singles, "Hey Cinderella".  However, lacking any real support from her label, "Give Me Some Wheels" reached only the bottom of the country charts. This was followed by "No Way Out" (later recorded by Julie Roberts on her self-titled debut album).

Track listing

Personnel 
 Suzy Bogguss - lead and backing vocals

Additional musicians

Production 
Producer: Scott Hendricks, Trey Bruce
Engineer: Mike Bradley, David Buchanan, Steve Marcantonio, Scott Hendricks, Russ Martin
Distributor: EMI Music Dist.
Studio: Sound Shop, Recording Arts and The Tracking Room, Nashville, TN.

Chart performance

Album

Singles

Release details 

1996 albums
Suzy Bogguss albums
Albums produced by Scott Hendricks
Liberty Records albums